

See also 
 Lists of fossiliferous stratigraphic units in Europe

References 
 

 Estonia
 
Estonia geology-related lists
Fossiliferous stratigraphic units